Jorge Roberto Saad Silveira (born September 9th, 1952, in Niterói) is a Brazilian politician.

He was elected four times Mayor of the city of Niterói, state of Rio de Janeiro, Brazil by the Democratic Labour Party.

References

Mayors of places in Brazil
Living people
Democratic Labour Party (Brazil) politicians
1952 births
People from Niterói